Jaszowice may refer to the following places in Poland:
Jaszowice, Lower Silesian Voivodeship (south-west Poland)
Jaszowice, Masovian Voivodeship (east-central Poland)